The 1951 Swiss motorcycle Grand Prix was the second race of the 1951 Grand Prix motorcycle racing season. It took place on 27 May 1951 at the Bremgarten circuit.

500 cc classification

350 cc classification

250 cc classification

Sidecar classification

References

Swiss motorcycle Grand Prix
Swiss motorcycle Grand Prix
Motorcycle Grand Prix